The first encirclement campaign against the Hubei–Henan–Anhui Soviet was an encirclement campaign launched by the Chinese Nationalist Government that was intended to destroy communist Hubei-Henan-Anhui Soviet and its Chinese Red Army in the local region.  It was responded by the Communists' first counter-encirclement campaign at Hubei–Henan–Anhui Soviet, also called by the communists as the first counter-encirclement campaign at Hubei–Henan–Anhui Revolutionary Base, in which the local Chinese Red Army successfully defended their soviet republic in the border region of Hubei, Henan, and Anhui provinces against the Nationalist attacks from November 1930 to 9 March 1931.

See also
List of battles of the Chinese Civil War
National Revolutionary Army
People's Liberation Army
History of the People's Liberation Army
Chinese Civil War

References
Military History Research Department, Complete History of the People's Liberation Army, Military Science Publishing House in Beijing, 2000, 

Campaigns of the Chinese Civil War
1930 in China
1931 in China

zh:豫鄂皖邊區第一次圍剿